Acqueville is a former commune in the Manche department in the Normandy region in northwestern France. On 1 January 2017, it was merged into the new commune La Hague.

Population

See also
Communes of the Manche department

References

Former communes of Manche